Svetozar Bukvić (25 April 1958–13 April 2020) was a politician in Serbia. He was the mayor of Kula from 2006 to 2011 and served in the Assembly of Vojvodina from 2008 to 2012. Bukvić was a member of the Democratic Party (Demokratska stranka, DS).

Early life and private career
Bukvić was born in the village of Lipar in Kula, Autonomous Province of Vojvodina, in what was then the People's Republic of Serbia in the Federal People's Republic of Yugoslavia. He graduated from the University of Novi Sad's Faculty of Mechanical Engineering in 1981, worked as a designer with the company Inomag from 1985 to 1992, and was then a teacher of mechanical engineering at the secondary school "Mihajlo Pupin" in Kula until 2002. From 2003 to 2006, he was director of Kula's Institute for Construction.

Politician
Serbia introduced the direct election of mayors in the 2004 Serbian local elections. Bukvić contested the election as an independent candidate and was defeated by  Tihomir Đuričić of the far-right Serbian Radical Party (Srpska radikalna stranka, SRS). Ðuričić was defeated in a recall election in 2006; a by-election was held shortly thereafter to choose a new mayor, and Bukvić (who had by this time joined the DS) was elected in the second round of voting.

Bukvić became mayor of Kula at a time of political instability in the community. The municipal assembly was often dysfunctional, and in late 2007 fellow DS member Velibor Milojičić was appointed as leader of an interim administration. Bukvić continued to serve as mayor, but his control over the municipal government was limited.

The direct election of mayors was eliminated with the 2008 local elections; since this time, mayors in Serbia have been chosen by the elected members of city and municipal assemblies. The DS won a narrow victory over the SRS in Kula in 2008, and Bukvić was chosen afterward for a second term as mayor. He was also elected to the Vojvodina assembly in the concurrent 2008 provincial election, defeating Đuričić by a significant margin in the Kula constituency seat. The DS and its allies won a majority victory in the provincial election, and Bukvić served as a supporter of the administration.

Kula's government continued to be dysfunctional after the 2008 election, and the local DS board became increasingly divided between supporters of Bukvić and Milojićić. During the course of this feud, Milojičić accused Bukvić of corruption and incompetency in office. Milojičić subsequently left the DS and joined the United Regions of Serbia (Ujedinjeni regioni Srbije, URS). The municipal assembly became completely dysfunctional in mid-2011 when DS members began boycotting its proceedings. Milojičić charged that this was done to prevent Bukvić from being removed from office. 

Bukvić ultimately resigned as mayor in late 2011, after a ruling that he could not continue to hold a dual mandate as a provincial assembly member. A provisional administration was established in December 2011.

Bukvić was not a candidate for re-election to the provincial assembly in 2012. The following year, he was appointed to a position in the provincial secretariat for economy and tourism. He remained in this role until his sudden death in 2020.

Electoral record

Provincial (Vojvodina)

Local (Kula)

References

1958 births
2020 deaths
People from Kula, Serbia
Mayors of places in Serbia
Members of the Assembly of Vojvodina
Democratic Party (Serbia) politicians